Maad a Signig Kumba Ndoffene Famak Joof (variations : Mad a Sinig Kumba Ndoffene Famak Joof, Mad a Sinig Coumba Ndoffène Fa mak Diouf, Coumba N'Doffène Diouf, Coumba N'Doffène Diouf I, Maat Sine Kumba Ndoffene Famak Joof, etc. - c. 1810 – 23 August 1871) was the King of Sine in modern-day Senegal. Maad a Sinig (var: Bour Sine or Mad a Sinig) means king of Sine (the Kingdom of Sine). He ruled from 1853 until his death on 23 August 1871. He was the son of Maad Souka Ndela Joof and Lingeer Gnilane Jogoy Joof. His father – Maad Souka Ndela came from The Royal House of Semou Njekeh Joof founded by Maad Semou Njekeh Joof in the early 18th century, which was the third and last Royal House of Joof family of Sine and Saloum (The Joof paternal dynasty of Sine and Saloum). His paternal family (the Joof family) ruled three Kingdoms : Sine, Kingdom of Saloum and previously the Kingdom of Baol. They descended from Maad Ndaah Njemeh Joof the 13th century King of Lâ (Laah) in Baol.

Kumba Ndoffene Famak's mother – Lingeer Gnilane Jogoy Joof came from the Maternal Dynasty of Guelowar. The Guelowars had ruled two Senegambian Kingdoms : Sine and Saloum. They had also provided two kings of Jolof and heirs to the thrones of Cayor and Baol. According to oral tradition, they originated from the royal family of Kaabu in the 14th century who were granted asylum by the Serer nobility of Sine following the alleged Battle of Troubang (1335) in Kaabu. In reporting this tradition, Henry Gravrand did not notice that this the description of the Battle of Troubang is actually a description of the 1867 (or 1865) Battle of Kansala. The name Famak (or Fa mak) means the elder in the Serer language. He should not be confused with his successor Maad a Sinig Kumba Ndoffene Fa Ndeb Joof (var: Coumba N'Doffène Diouf II) who reigned from c. 1898 to 1924. The name Fa Ndeb/Fandeb (variations: Fa ndeb or Fandepp) means the younger in Serer. The prefix Famak is a later addition in order to differentiate him from his successor.

Succession and coronation 
Kumba Ndoffene Famak succeeded to the throne in 1853 following the death of the young King, Maad a Sinig Ama Joof Gnilane Faye Joof. In September 1853, Kumba Ndoffene Famak was crowned Maad a Sinig Kumba Ndoffene Joof from The Royal House of Semou Njekeh Joof. The Great Jaraff (head of the Noble Council of Electors responsible for electing the kings from the Royal Family) presided over the sacred ceremony. Guests included the King's paternal and maternal family as well as the dignitaries of Sine.
Maad Kumba Ndoffene Famak Joof's succession to the throne went unchallenged during the 19th century.

External threats 
The reign of Maad Kumba Ndoffene Famak was in constant threat by two external forces : the French who wanted to extend their authority in his Kingdom following the defeat of Waalo under Lingeer Ndateh Yalla Mboge and by Tafsir Amat Jahu Bah more commonly known as Maba Diakhou Bâ who wanted to Islamize the Animist Serer people of Sine and Saloum.

Leadership style 

Maad a Sinig Kumba Ndoffene Famak was a very strong leader whose word was generally accepted by the French. However, sometimes he had his reasons for giving very limited protection to the French merchants and even less protection to the French missionaries, whom he regarded as spies of the French administration in Senegal and the French government in Paris.
This rumour was first circulated by his predecessor — Maad a Sinig Ama Joof Gnilane Faye Joof, who stopped the French from building any bricked chapel or church in his Kingdom. During the first few years of Maad Kumba Ndoffene Famak's reign, the Mission at N'Gasobil faced constant harassments designed to force their departure. The people were not only ordered not to sell anything to the mission, but also not to send their children to Christian schools in fear that the mission would corrupt the minds of the young.

In 1856, Father Lamoise and Kobes (accompanied by French officers) went to Sine to see Maad Kumba Ndoffene Famak. They presented their complaints to the king about the constant harassments which began during the reign of Maad Ama Joof Gnilane Faye Joof. Lamoise also used the meeting to seek the king's permission to build a brick chapel. Permission was not granted. Lamoise threatened to build a brick chapel with or without the king's permission. Maad Kumba Ndoffene Famak threatened to kill Lamoise if he dared to disobey his orders. Nothing was achieved by the French in that meeting.

Maad a Sinig Kumba Ndoffene was related to the other Senegambian royal families (Jolof, Cayor, Baol, Waalo and Saloum) and was known for giving asylum to the royal families of those kingdoms, so much so that the French governor of Senegal at the time—Pinet Laprade used to refer to him as "the King of Kings."

Siege of Kaolack 
In 1866, the French governor Émile Pinet-Laprade tried to encourage resettlement around Kaolack (a province of the Kingdom of Saloum) and promised to restore order and trade there. He failed to achieve that. Kaolack which was previously sacked by the Muslim marabouts in 1865 falls within the jurisdiction of Saloum, ruled by the Maad Saloum (king of Saloum), and not by the Maad a Sinig (king of Sine). It was part of the jurisdiction of Maad Saloum Fakha Boya Latsouka Fall. The King of Sine (Maad a Sinig Kumba Ndoffene Famak) was not willing to persuade his people to settle in a war zone.

Laprade (and his predecessors Faidherbe and Jauréguibéry) who previously had nothing good to say about the Serers, referring to them "drunkards" and "violent against the Muslims" now needed Maad Kumba Ndoffene Famak's assistance to solve the problem in Kaolack. He wrote several letters to Maad Kumba Ndoffene Famak begging him to do something. To secure the support of Maad Kumba Ndoffene Famak, Laprade changed his strategy by calling the Muslim marabouts "thieves".

When Maad Kumba Ndoffene Famak tried to offer help to the King of Saloum (Fakha Boya Latsouka Fall), the King of Saloum turned him down and refused to listen to him. According to some (such as Klein, Bâ, etc.), Fakha Boya was a weak king who was unwilling or unable to solve the Kaolack problem, his own province. However, the consensus is that, the sacking of Kaolack by the marabout forces would not have happened without Laprade. It was Laprade who initially asked Fakha Boya whether he could withdraw his army from the Kaolack post for a short period so that trade could resume with the marabouts. That was after he tried and failed to conquer the Kingdom of Saloum. When King Fakha Boya withdrew his army from the Kaolack post, Laprade immediately informed Maba Diakhou Ba in July 1864 that the army of Fakha Boya had left and he can come back. When the marabout came, they ransacked and looted Kaolack and virtually control it. As the situation worsened in Kaolack, Maad Fakha Boya lost all control in Kaolack, and the marabouts were no longer willing to listen to Laprade. As such, Laprade lost all influence he had on the marabouts and needed Maad Kumba Ndoffene Famak's assistance to deal with the problem.

Maad Kumba Ndoffene Famak against the Muslim marabouts 

Maad Kumba Ndoffene Famak resisted against French expansionism, and the strategy of the French to use him against Maba Diakhou Bâ. According to some, had he accepted the French's terms and strategy, Maba would have been killed in the 1850s. Émile Pinet-Laprade mistook that for cowardice which was not the case.

However in 1867, Maba Diakhou who had avoided the animist Kingdom of Sine for six years decided to launch a jihad in the Sine. The British administration in the Gambia and the French administration in Senegal had both tried to get rid of Maba Diakhou when relations broke down, but failed. Governor George Abbas Kooli D'Arcy (the British governor in the Gambia) was arming Maba and the marabout forces with British weapons. He also planned and executed the invasion of the Mandinka animist State of Baddibu in the Gambia in a revenge attack against the British traders by animist Baddibu. D'Arcy planned his invasion to coincide with the French's unsuccessful invasion of animist Serer Saloum in 1861.

Almost a week after Maba's victory in Kaolack, a large group of his disciples entered Sine. Maba himself did not enter Sine. The battle was indecisive as the marabout forces withdrew when they realised that they could not penetrate Sine.

The surprise of Mbin o Ngor (Mbetaan Keur Ngor) 
Mbin o Ngor (var: Mbon o NGOOR) is a small Serer village in Sine. The Surprise of Mbin o Ngor in 1867 was not an open battle. It was a surprise attack by the marabouts against the Serer community of this village. The Wolof term for it is "Mbetaan Keur Ngor" which means "the surprise attack of Keur Ngor". "Mbetaan" means surprise. In the Serer language, the incident is known as "Mbin o Ngor".

In the Serer oral tradition, the incident occurred on a Wednesday. In those days taxes were collected on Wednesdays. That day Maad Kumba Ndoffene Famak also attended the funeral of one of his warriors. It was the funeral of Dyé Tyass, one of the warriors of Sine. Maad Kumba Ndoffene Famak and his entourage were also later obliged to participate in the final phase of the ceremony of the newly circumcised young boys of Somb. This festival is one of the last phases of the initiation were they perform a dance before the king and the rest of the royal family who in turn give them gifts for their courage. The funeral of Dyé Tyass coincided with this ceremony and the King's secretary was told by the King to inform the initiates he will meet them later at Mbin o Ngor after the funeral at Dielem. Historians and theologians note that, in Serer religion, "funerals are the occasion of much eating and drinking" - celebrating the life of the departed as they make their journey to the next life. Therefore, apart from attacking civilians, Sine's defenses would have been down.

The King of Cayor - Damel Lat Dior Ngoné Latyr Diop is said to be the instigator of this surprise attack. Lat Dior who is reported to have had a long grudge against Maad Kumba Ndoffene Famak after his defeat and exile by the French administration at the Battle of Loro (January 12, 1864) sought refuge in Sine. Maad Kumba Ndoffene Famak granted him asylum. Oral tradition says Lat Dior was well received in Sine. Lat Dior also needed military support from Maad Kumba Ndoffene Famak in order to launch a war against the French and regain his throne. Maad Kumba Ndoffene Famak was unable to provide military support to Lat Dior, because he was involved in a long battle against the French administration regarding the sovereignty of Joal (a province of Sine). Lat Dior sought military support from Maba. Maba promised to help Lat Dior if he converts to Islam. Lat Dior converted to Islam, and in 1867, persuaded Maba to launch a jihad in the Kingdom of Sine.

There is no consensus as to whether Maba went to Mbin o Ngor or not. Serer oral sources gives detailed account of the incident, incriminating several prominent members of the marabout movement some of which include Lat Dior and Gumbo Gaye. Serer oral tradition says that Maba went to Mbin o Ngor and it was he who killed Boucary Ngoneh Joof (many variations: Boucar Ngoné Diouf - a cousin of Maad Kumba Ndoffene Famak who is reported to have sacrificed his life in the incident in order to preserve the honour of Sine). Muslim marabout oral sources agree pretty much with Serer sources, except that Maba did not go to Mbin o Ngor (Keur Ngor, in Wolof). When Maat Kumba Ndoffene Famak finally managed to mobilize the army of Sine, the marabout army retreated. However, before their retreat, they had managed to cause serious damage in Sine and kidnapped some prominent princesses of Sine including the daughter of Maad Kumba Ndoffene Famak (Lingeer Selbeh Ndoffene Joof). During her abduction, Lingeer Selbeh Ndoffene was given in marriage to Abdoulaye Wuli Bâ (brother of Maba).

The Battle of Fandane-Thiouthioune (Somb) 

After the surprise attack at Mbin o Ngor, Maad Kumba Ndoffene Famak wrote a letter to Maba Diakhou Bâ telling him that the surprise attack he launched in Sine was undignified and invited him to an open battle. On 18 July 1867, Maba and his army came. In this battle - The Battle of Fandane-Thiouthioune (commonly known as the Battle of Somb), Maba Diakhou Bâ was defeated. He died in this battle and his body was decapitated. Maba's brother (Abdoulaye Wuli Bâ) was not killed in this battle. He was castrated.

Death 
Maad a Sine Kumba Ndoffene Famak Joof was assassinated in Joal by the French in August 1871. He went to Joal to exercise his authority over the sovereignty of Joal.

Legacy 
It was during Maad a Sinig Kumba Ndoffene Famak Joof's reign that an old traditional Serer song and proverb were officially adopted as the national anthem and motto of Sine. The song sang in his honour after his victory at The Battle of Fandane-Thiouthioune is still chanted by the Serer people of Sine and Saloum. Maad a Sinig Kumba Ndoffene Famak Joof is still admired by the Serer people for resisting against French colonialism, securing the independence of Sine and the safety of his people. It was after his death that the kings of Sine succeeded one another at an astounding rate.
For the Serers who adhere to Serer religion, Maad Kumba Ndoffene Famak is also admired for defeating the marabouts who threatened the religion of their forefathers. He was a valiant warrior and a strong leader whose succession to the throne went unchallenged in the 19th century. His victory at The Battle of Fandane-Thiouthioune is deemed by some historians (such as Klein, Bâ, Thiam, C. Diouf, etc.) as the division of Senegambian communities between Muslims and followers of Serer religion.

Genealogy 
The following genealogy gives the line of descent from Maad a Sinig Kumba Ndoffene Famak Joof to his ancestor Maad Semou Njekeh Joof, founder of The Royal House of Semou Njekeh Joof in the 18th century. It was the third and last Royal House founded by the Joof Dynasty of Sine and Saloum during the Guelowar period. The first being The Royal House of Boure Gnilane Joof, founded in the 14th century. The first King to rule the Kingdom of Sine from The Royal House of Semou Njekeh Joof was Maad a Sinig Boukar Tjilas Sanghaie Joof (Boukar Tjilas Sanghaie Diouf, French spelling in Senegal, - reigned: 1724 - 1735) son of Maad Semou Njekeh.

Genealogy of Maat Sine Kumba Ndoffene Famak Joof
                                                        Maad Semou Njekeh Joof
                           (Founder of The Royal House of Semou Njekeh Joof, Kingdom of Sine)
                                                                  │
                             _│
                             │
                             │
                             │
                    Biram Baro Joof            =        Lingeer Ndela Ndaw                       =  ?
                   (Prince of Sine)            │        (Princess of Saloum)                     │ (2)
                                               │                                                 │
                                               │                                                 │
                       │                                                 │
                       │                                                                 Maad Amad Ngoneh Joof
            Maad Souka Ndela Joof                                                       (King of Thiouthioune)
              (Kingdom of Sine)    =        Lingeer Gnilane Jogoy Joof
                                   │   (Also known as: Fan Kumba Ndoffene)
                                   │            (Princess of Sine)
                                   │
                                   │
                       ┌───────────┴────────────────────────────────────────┐
          Maad a Sinig Kumba Ndoffene Famak Joof                         Lingeer Nadi Joof
                     (King of Sine)                                        (Queen of Sine)

See also

Notes

Bibliography 
 Klein, Martin A. Islam and Imperialism in Senegal Sine-Saloum, 1847–1914, p. 106. Published by Edingburg University Press (1968). 
 Faal, Dawda. Peoples and empires of Senegambia: Senegambia in history, AD 1000–1900. p. 84. Saul's Modern Printshop, 1991
Diouf, Niokhobaye. "Chronique du royaume du Sine." Suivie de notes sur les traditions orales et les sources écrites concernant le royaume du Sine par Charles Becker et Victor Martin. (1972). Bulletin de l'Ifan, Tome 34, Série B, n° 4, (1972).
Thiaw, Issa Laye. "La Religiousite des Sereer, Avant et Pendant Leur Islamisation." Ethiopiques, No: 54, Revue Semestrielle de Culture Négro-Africaine. Nouvelle Série, Volume 7, 2e Semestre 1991. Aussi: A. Corre. "Les Sérères de Joal et de Portudal. (1883). Paris, Rev.)
l'epopee de Sanmoon Fay. "La famille Juuf". Ethiopiques n°54 revue semestrielle de culture négro-africaine Nouvelle série volume 7 2e semestre 1991
Diouf, Cheikh. Fiscalité et Domination Coloniale: : 1859–1940. Université Cheikh Anta Diop de Dakar—(2005)
Sarr, Alioune. "Histoire du Sine-Saloum (Sénégal)." Introduction, bibliographie et notes par Charles Becker. Version légèrement remaniée par rapport à celle qui est parue en 1986-87 co 1985.
Diouf, Mahawa, L'information Historique:  du Siin. Ethiopiques n°54 revue semestrielle de culture négro-africaine Nouvelle série volume 7 2e semestre 1991
Thiam, Iba Der, Maba Diakhou Ba Almamy du Rip (Sénégal), Paris, ABC, Dakar-Abidjan, NEA, 1977
Lanker, Nadine Van & Lussier-Lejeune, Florence. Sénégal. L'homme et la mer, Dossiers Pédagogiques. Année scolaire 2006–2007, Projet Qualité

Serer royalty
Former monarchies of Africa
Joof family
Year of birth uncertain
1871 deaths
Maad
1810 births
19th-century monarchs in Africa
Former countries in Africa
Tijaniyyah order